Clemensia marmorata is a moth of the family Erebidae first described by William Schaus in 1896. It is found in Paraná, Brazil.

References

Cisthenina
Moths described in 1896